Vocal jazz or jazz singing is an approach to jazz using the voice.  

Vocal jazz emerged in the early twentieth century, with its roots in Blues. Popular blues singers such as Bessie Smith and Ma Rainey had a great deal of influence of jazz vocalists such as Billie Holiday. Other characteristics of vocal jazz such as scat singing came out of the New Orleans jazz tradition. Louis Armstrong's 1926 recording of "Heebie Jeebies" is often cited as the first modern song to employ scatting. This later evolved into the complex vocal improvisation of the bop era that was adopted by Anita O'Day, Sarah Vaughan, Betty Carter, and Dizzy Gillespie. The Boswell Sisters were a vocal jazz trio originating from New Orleans that help popularize vocal jazz music among the general American public during the 1930s.

Repertoire of vocal jazz typically includes the music of the Great American Songbook, however contemporary popular music is now often arranged for vocal jazz ensembles in addition to original music. Such arrangements/original music typically employ the harmonic language of jazz, improvisation, and rhythms derived from the syncretized music of West Africa, African-Americans, and European Art Music traditions. This includes swing music, as well as Latin jazz, jazz fusion, and rhythm and blues. 

Technical characteristics of vocal jazz include diction based on vernacular rather than formal speech patterns. Legato and vibrato are also not constants in the articulation of vocal jazz. Vocal jazz often uses microphone amplification and singers are accompanied by a rhythm section (piano, bass, drums, and guitar) and sometimes vocal percussion.

History 
Early in the twentieth century, jazz began developing as a musical movement. Jazz singing, or vocal jazz, was the last of four innately American musical conceptions to develop, along with instrumental jazz, the blues, and Tin Pan Alley songwriting.

While vocal jazz emerged during the early twentieth century, it was the turn of the 21st century where jazz fans began to accept the broader definition of vocal jazz.

See also
 Vocalese
 Scat singing

References

 
Jazz music education
Vocal music